The 1968 All England Championships was a badminton tournament held at Wembley Arena, London, England, from 19–23 March 1968.

Final results

Muljadi was formerly known as Ang Tjin Siang. Mary O'Sullivan married and became Mary Bryan.

Men's singles

Section 1

Section 2

+ Denotes seed

Women's singles

Section 1

Section 2

References

All England Open Badminton Championships
All England
All England Open Badminton Championships in London
All England Badminton Championships
All England Badminton Championships
All England Badminton Championships